The 2018 election to the Grand Council was held in the canton of Geneva, Switzerland, on 15 April 2018.  All 100 members of the Grand Council were elected for four-year terms.

Results

|-
! style="background-color:#E9E9E9;text-align:left;" colspan=2 |Party
! style="background-color:#E9E9E9;text-align:left;" width=150px |Ideology
! style="background-color:#E9E9E9;text-align:right;" width=50px |Vote %
! style="background-color:#E9E9E9;text-align:right;" width=50px |Vote % ±
! style="background-color:#E9E9E9;text-align:right;" width=50px |Seats
! style="background-color:#E9E9E9;text-align:right;" width=50px |Seats ±
|-
| style="background-color: " |
| style="text-align:left;" | PLR.The Liberal-Radicals (PLR)
| style="text-align:left;" | Classical liberalism
| style="text-align:right;" | 25.18
| style="text-align:right;" | +2.81
| style="text-align:right;" | 28
| style="text-align:right;" | +4
|-
| style="background-color: " |
| style="text-align:left;" | Socialist Party (PS)
| style="text-align:left;" | Democratic socialism
| style="text-align:right;" | 15.30
| style="text-align:right;" | +0.97
| style="text-align:right;" | 17
| style="text-align:right;" | +2
|-
| style="background-color: " |
| style="text-align:left;" | Greens (PES)
| style="text-align:left;" | Green politics
| style="text-align:right;" | 13.16
| style="text-align:right;" | +4.00
| style="text-align:right;" | 15
| style="text-align:right;" | +5
|-
| style="background-color: " |
| style="text-align:left;" | Christian Democratic Party (PDC)
| style="text-align:left;" | Christian democracy
| style="text-align:right;" | 10.71
| style="text-align:right;" | +0.11
| style="text-align:right;" | 12
| style="text-align:right;" | +1
|-
| style="background-color: " |
| style="text-align:left;" | Geneva Citizens' Movement (MCG)
| style="text-align:left;" | Right-wing populism
| style="text-align:right;" | 9.43
| style="text-align:right;" | −9.80
| style="text-align:right;" | 11
| style="text-align:right;" | −9
|-
| style="background-color: " |
| style="text-align:left;" | Together Left (EAG)1
| style="text-align:left;" | Communism
| style="text-align:right;" | 7.83
| style="text-align:right;" | −0.92
| style="text-align:right;" | 9
| style="text-align:right;" | 0
|-
| style="background-color: " |
| style="text-align:left;" | Democratic Union of the Centre (UDC)
| style="text-align:left;" | National conservatism
| style="text-align:right;" | 7.32
| style="text-align:right;" | −3.02
| style="text-align:right;" | 8
| style="text-align:right;" | −3
|-
| style="background-color: grey |
| style="text-align:left;" | Geneva Forward
| style="text-align:left;" | 
| style="text-align:right;" | 4.10
| style="text-align:right;" | +4.10
| style="text-align:right;" | 0
| style="text-align:right;" | 0
|-
| style="background-color: grey |
| style="text-align:left;" | Women's List 2018
| style="text-align:left;" | 
| style="text-align:right;" | 3.26
| style="text-align:right;" | +3.26
| style="text-align:right;" | 0
| style="text-align:right;" | 0
|-
| style="background-color: " |
| style="text-align:left;" | Green Liberal Party
| style="text-align:left;" | Green liberalism
| style="text-align:right;" | 1.60
| style="text-align:right;" | −1.46
| style="text-align:right;" | 0
| style="text-align:right;" | 0
|-
| style="background-color: grey |
| style="text-align:left;" | Equality and Equity
| style="text-align:left;" | 
| style="text-align:right;" | 0.88
| style="text-align:right;" | +0.88
| style="text-align:right;" | 0
| style="text-align:right;" | 0
|-
| style="background-color: grey |
| style="text-align:left;" | List for Geneva
| style="text-align:left;" | 
| style="text-align:right;" | 0.71
| style="text-align:right;" | +0.71
| style="text-align:right;" | 0
| style="text-align:right;" | 0
|-
| style="background-color: " |
| style="text-align:left;" | Conservative Democratic Party
| style="text-align:left;" | Conservative liberalism
| style="text-align:right;" | 0.52
| style="text-align:right;" | −0.04
| style="text-align:right;" | 0
| style="text-align:right;" | 0
|- style="background: #E9E9E9"
! style="text-align:left;" colspan=3| Total
| style="text-align:right;" |  100.00
| style="text-align:right;" | –
| 100
| style="text-align:right;" | –
|- style="background: #E9E9E9"
! style="text-align:left;" colspan=3| Turnout
| style="text-align:right;" |  38.77
| style="text-align:right;" |  2.28 
|  –
| style="text-align:right;" | –
|-
| colspan=9 style="text-align:left;" | 1 Alliance of SolidaritéS, Swiss Party of Labour, left-wing independents, Defence of the Elderly, Tenants of Housing and Social (DAL), Alternative Left,the Communist Party of Geneva, and Action of Citizens and Workers in Struggle (ACTE) 
|-
| colspan=9 style="text-align:left;" | Source: Republic and Canton of Geneva
|}

References

2018 elections in Switzerland
Grand Council of Geneva elections
2018 in Switzerland